Jacques Solomon (4 February 1908 – 23 May 1942) was a French physicist and Marxist who played a central role in the debate over quantum mechanics in France in the 1930s and 1940s. He was killed by firing squad at Fort Mont-Valérien in 1942.

Early years

Jacques Solomon was born on 4 February 1908 in the 18th arrondissement of Paris.
Solomon's father, Iser Solomon, was a medical radiologist and member of various learned societies in Europe and America.
Jacques Solomon was a very brilliant pupil at Collège Rollin and became an intern at the Hôpitaux de Paris, then began studying physics and mathematics at the Sorbonne.
At the time, the course covered subjects such as optics, electricity and classical mechanics, but not more recent subjects such as statistical mechanics, Maxwell's electromagnetism or the controversial subjects of relativity and quantum mechanics.

Solomon was researching theoretical physics at the Centre national de la recherche scientifique in 1929 when he married Hélène Langevin (1909–95), daughter of Paul Langevin (1872–1946), a professor at the Collège de France.
In 1931, Solomon submitted a thesis on electrodynamics and quantum theory, which earned him recognition as one of the greatest physicists of his time.
At the age of 29, he began teaching at the Collège de France.
Both Solomon and Matvei Petrovich Bronstein believed in the need for a radically different method of treating quantum gravity, since the present theory of field quantization seemed incompatible with the non-linear theory of gravitation. Both were to die during the war.

In 1934, Solomon joined the French Communist Party (PCE).
He taught at the Open University, and contributed to the Cahiers du Bolchevisme and to L'Humanité.
In 1935, he worked for the election of Paul Rivet, the first member of the Popular Front to be elected.
After the Munich Agreement of 30 September 1938, he was one of the secretaries of the Union des intellectuels français pour la justice, la liberté et la paix (UDIF).

World War II

With the outbreak of World War II (1939-45), Solomon was mobilized in the medical service, first in Courseulles, Calvados, and then in Agen. He was demobilized at the end of June 1940 and after a month returned to Paris. Georges Politzer was in touch with the clandestine PCE through Pierre Villon, and in September and October 1940 Solomon, Georges Politzer and Jacques Decour tried to contact and organize the universities.
After Paul Langevin was arrested by the Germans on 30 October 1940 Solomon, Politzer and Fernand Holweck organized protests by students and professors in front of the College de France on 5 and 8 November 1940. He adopted the pseudonym "Jacques Pinel", and with his wife was one of the main contributors to the Université libre, which began to appear in November 1940 and exposed the "obscurantism" and antisemitism of the Vichy regime. He also contributed to La Pensée libre.

Georges Politzer was arrested on 14 February 1942.
Jacques Solomon was arrested by the special brigades on 2 March 1942 in a Paris cafe where he was having a working meeting for L'Université'' with Dr. Jean-Claude Bauer, who was also arrested.
He was interned at the police station until 20 March, then at the Cherche-Midi prison until 11 May, and finally at La Santé Prison.
He was handed over to the Germans and executed as a hostage on 23 May 1942 at Fort Mont-Valérien on the same day as Politzer and Bauer.
84 hostages were executed that month. The last four, executed on 30 May 1942 in reprisal for an attempted assassination in Le Havre on 23 May 1942, were  Arthur Dallidet, Félix Cadras,  Jacques Decour and Louis Salomon.

In 1951, Jacques Solomon was given the posthumous title of Commandant of the Front Nationale.
His wife, Hélène, had been arrested on 10 March 1942. She was taken to the Auschwitz concentration camp, then to Ravensbrück concentration camp.
She managed to survive the war, and lived on until 1995.

Main publications

Notes

Sources

External links

 

1908 births
1942 deaths
French communists
French physicists
French military doctors
French military personnel of World War II
Communist members of the French Resistance